Witham is a town in Essex, England.

Witham may also refer to:

Places
Witham on the Hill, Lincolnshire, England
Witham St Hughs, Lincolnshire, England
Witham Friary, Somerset, England
Witham, UK Parliament constituency

People
Witham (surname)
Other
River Witham, a river in Lincolnshire, England

See also 
North Witham, Lincolnshire, England
South Witham, Lincolnshire, England
Witham Field, an airport in Florida
Withams, Virginia
Wytham, a village in Oxfordshire, England